Melhania damarana is a plant in the family Malvaceae, native to southern Africa.

Description

Distribution and habitat
Melhania damarana is native to Botswana, Namibia and South Africa (Cape Provinces). Its habitat is in dry areas on the fringes of the Namib desert.

References

External links
 – images

damarana
Flora of Botswana
Flora of Namibia
Flora of the Cape Provinces
Plants described in 1862
Taxa named by William Henry Harvey